In criminal law, Blackstone's ratio (also known as Blackstone's formulation) is the idea that:

as expressed by the English jurist William Blackstone in his seminal work Commentaries on the Laws of England, published in the 1760s.

The idea subsequently became a staple of legal thinking in Anglo-Saxon jurisdictions and continues to be a topic of debate. There is also a long pre-history of similar sentiments going back centuries in a variety of legal traditions. The message that government and the courts must err on the side of bringing in verdicts of innocence has remained constant.

In Blackstone's Commentaries
The phrase, repeated widely and usually in isolation, comes from a longer passage, the fourth in a series of five discussions of policy by Blackstone:

The phrase was absorbed by the British legal system, becoming a maxim by the early 19th century. It was also absorbed into American common law, cited repeatedly by that country's Founding Fathers, later becoming a standard drilled into law students all the way into the 21st century.

Other commentators have echoed the principle. Benjamin Franklin stated it as: "it is better 100 guilty Persons should escape than that one innocent Person should suffer".

Defending British soldiers charged with murder for their role in the Boston Massacre, John Adams also expanded upon the rationale behind Blackstone's Ratio when he stated: We find, in the rules laid down by the greatest English Judges, who have been the brightest of mankind; We are to look upon it as more beneficial, that many guilty persons should escape unpunished, than one innocent person should suffer. The reason is, because it’s of more importance to community, that innocence should be protected, than it is, that guilt should be punished; for guilt and crimes are so frequent in the world, that all of them cannot be punished; and many times they happen in such a manner, that it is not of much consequence to the public, whether they are punished or not. But when innocence itself, is brought to the bar and condemned, especially to die, the subject will exclaim, it is immaterial to me, whether I behave well or ill; for virtue itself, is no security. And if such a sentiment as this, should take place in the mind of the subject, there would be an end to all security what so ever. Given that Sir Matthew Hale and Sir John Fortescue in English law had made similar statements previously, some kind of explanation is required for the enormous popularity and influence of the phrase across all the Anglo-Saxon legal systems. Cullerne Bown has argued that it "...can be seen as a new kind of buttress of the law that was required in a new kind of society."

Historic expressions of the principle
The immediate precursors of Blackstone's ratio in English law were articulations by Hale (about 100 years earlier) and Fortescue (about 200 years before that), both influential jurists in their time. Hale wrote: "for it is better five guilty persons should escape unpunished, than one innocent person should die." Fortescue's De Laudibus Legum Angliae (c. 1470) states that "one would much rather that twenty guilty persons should escape the punishment of death, than that one innocent person should be condemned and suffer capitally."

Some 300 years before Fortescue, the Jewish legal theorist Maimonides wrote that "the Exalted One has shut this door" against the use of presumptive evidence, for "it is better and more satisfactory to acquit a thousand guilty persons than to put a single innocent one to death."

Maimonides argued that executing an accused criminal on anything less than absolute certainty would progressively lead to convictions merely "according to the judge's caprice" and was expounding on both Exodus 23:7 ("do not bring death on those who are innocent and in the right") and an Islamic text, the Jami' al-Tirmidhi.

Islamic scholar Al-Tirmidhi quotes the Prophet Muhammad as saying, "Avoid legal punishments as far as possible, and if there are any doubts in the case then use them, for it is better for a judge to err towards leniency than towards punishment".  Another similar expression reads, "Invoke doubtfulness in evidence during prosecution to avoid legal punishments". 

Other statements, some even older, which seem to express similar sentiments have been compiled by Alexander Volokh. A vaguely similar principle, echoing the number ten and the idea that it would be preferable that many guilty people escape consequences than a few innocents suffer them, appears as early as the narrative of the Cities of the Plain in Genesis (at 18:23–32),

With respect to the destruction of Sodom, the text describes it as ultimately being destroyed, but only after the rescuing of most of Lot's family, the aforementioned "righteous" among a city or overwhelming wickedness who, despite the overwhelming guilt of their fellows, were sufficient by their mere presence to warrant a "stay of execution" of sorts for the entire region, slated to be destroyed for being uniformly a place of sin. The text continues, 

Similarly, on 3 October 1692, while decrying the Salem witch trials, Increase Mather adapted Fortescue's statement and wrote, "It were better that Ten Suspected Witches should escape, than that one Innocent Person should be Condemned."

The Russian writer Fyodor Dostoevsky in his work "The Brothers Karamazov", written in 1880, referred to the phrase "It is better to acquit ten guilty than to punish one innocent!"("Лучше оправдать десять виновных, чем наказать одного невиновного!»), which has existed in Russian legislation since 1712, during the reign of Peter the Great. Therefore, it is ahead of Blackstone's statement, but a very few English-speaking legal historians have yet paid attention to this.

Even Voltaire in 1748 in the work of Zadig used a similar saying, although in French his thought is stated differently than in the English translation:

In current scholarship
Blackstone's principle influenced the nineteenth-century development of "beyond a reasonable doubt" as the burden of proof in criminal law. Many commentators suggest that Blackstone's ratio determines the confidence interval of the burden of proof; for example Jack B. Weinstein wrote:
Blackstone would have put the probability standard for proof "beyond a reasonable doubt" at somewhat more than 90%, for he declared: "It is better that ten guilty persons escape than one innocent suffer."
Pi et al. advocate formalizing this in jury instructions. However, Daniel Epps argues that this is too simplistic, ignoring such factors as jury behaviour, plea bargains, appeals procedures, and "the percentage of innocent persons among the pool of charged defendants".

Particularly in the United States, Blackstone's ratio continues to be an active source of debate in jurisprudence. For example Daniel Epps and Laura Appleman exchanged arguments against and in favour of its continuing influence in the Harvard Law Review in 2015.

Legal and moral philosopher, Fritz Allhoff has supported the essence of Blackstone's ratio. He submits that punishing the innocent "violates notions of desert". He further defends this position by appealing to the liability principle, which is grounded in just war theory. He suggests that "the guilty are liable to punishment, whereas the innocent are not" making the punishment of the innocent manifestly unjust, therefore the innocent should face no prospect of being punished; and Blackstone’s Ratio is a means to this end. He has, however, criticised the fact that Blackstone's ratio offers a static burden of proof; wherein prosecuting someone facing trial for a $10 fine, would require the same standard of evidence as prosecuting someone facing the death penalty - under Blackstone's ratio at least. He comments; "If the tolerance for wrongful convictions varied based on the punishment, it would more accurately track our — or at least my — moral intuitions". Suggesting that, the greater the consequence of a guilty verdict, the greater the standard of proof required.

Viewpoints in politics
Authoritarian personalities tend to take the opposite view. According to the Communist defector, Jung Chang, similar reasoning was deployed during the uprisings in Jiangxi, China in the 1930s: "Better to kill a hundred innocent people than let one truly guilty person go free," and during uprisings in Vietnam in the 1950s: "Better to kill ten innocent people than let a guilty person escape." Similarly in Cambodia, Pol Pot's Khmer Rouge adopted a similar policy: "better arrest an innocent person than leave a guilty one free." Wolfgang Schäuble referenced this principle while saying that it is not applicable to the context of preventing terrorist attacks. Former American Vice President Dick Cheney said that his support of American use of "enhanced interrogation techniques"  against suspected terrorists was unchanged by the fact that 25% of CIA detainees subject to that treatment were later proven to be innocent, including one who died of hypothermia in CIA custody.  "I'm more concerned with bad guys who got out and released than I am with a few that in fact were innocent."  Asked whether the 25% margin was too high, Cheney responded, "I have no problem as long as we achieve our objective. ...  I'd do it again in a minute."

Other considerations

Volokh considers two criminal cases in which the defense told the jury "that no innocent person should be convicted and that it is better that many guilty go unpunished than one innocent person be convicted" as references to a Blackstone's ratio with values of both "infinite" and "many" guilty men to an innocent one. He notes its importance in the inspiration of Western criminal law, but concludes by citing a question of its soundness: The story is told of a Chinese law professor, who listened as a British lawyer explained that Britons were so enlightened that they believed it was better that ninety-nine guilty men go free than that one innocent man be executed . The Chinese professor thought for a second and asked, "Better for whom?"

References

Citations

Sources

See also
 Al-Ma'idah, the fifth chapter (sūrah) of the Quran, "whoever kills a person, unless it be for man-slaughter or for mischief in the land, it is as though he had killed all men."
 Type I and type II errors

Ethical principles
Criminal justice ethics
Anti-fascism